Edward Bancroft Williston (July 15, 1837 – April 24, 1920) was a brigadier general in the United States Army. He was a recipient of the Medal of Honor for gallantry during the American Civil War.

Biography
Williston was born in Norwich, Vermont, and graduated from Norwich University in 1856. Earlier that year, he was one of the first initiated members of Theta Chi fraternity at the school.

On August 5, 1861, Williston was commissioned in the 2nd United States Artillery as a second lieutenant in San Francisco, California. Later that year, on September 27, he was promoted to first lieutenant. On June 12, 1864, Williston received the Medal of Honor for his actions at Trevilian Station, Virginia as part of Battery D, 2nd United States Artillery, as part of the famed U.S. Horse Artillery Brigade. The medal citation is for his "distinguished gallantry in action at Trevillian Station, Virginia, June 2, 1864."

Effective March 8, 1865, Williston promoted to captain. He was brevetted captain on May 3, 1863, for "gallant and meritorious services in action at Salem Heights, Virginia" and brevetted Major for the same at the Battle of Gettysburg on July 3, 1863. He was brevetted Lieutenant Colonel on September 19, 1864 in the Battle of Winchester and brevetted Colonel on March 13, 1865.

However it was not until March 22, 1885, before Williston was permanently promoted to major in the 3rd U.S. Artillery, reaching lieutenant colonel ten years later on February 12, 1895. He reached full colonel in the 6th U.S. Artillery on March 8, 1898.

During the Spanish–American War, Williston was promoted to brigadier general of volunteers on March 4, 1898; he was discharged from the volunteers on June 12, 1899, and reverted to his permanent rank of colonel.  He retired on July 15, 1900; by an act of Congress, he was promoted to brigadier general on the retired list on April 23, 1904. 

Married to Flora E. Chatfield Williston (1861–1944), Williston retired to Portland, Oregon, and died there on April 24, 1920. He was buried at Arlington National Cemetery, with his wife being buried next to him twenty four years later.

Medal of Honor citation
Rank and organization: First Lieutenant, 2d U.S. Artillery. Place and date: At Trevilian Station, Va., June 12, 1864. Entered service at: San Francisco, Calif. Birth: Norwich, Vt. Date of issue: April 6, 1892.

Citation:

Distinguished gallantry.

See also

 List of Medal of Honor recipients
 List of American Civil War Medal of Honor recipients: T–Z

References

External links
 
 

1837 births
1920 deaths
United States Army Medal of Honor recipients
Burials at Arlington National Cemetery
Norwich University alumni
People of Vermont in the American Civil War
Union Army officers
United States Army generals
Military personnel from Portland, Oregon
American Civil War recipients of the Medal of Honor